Come Back Peter may refer to:
 Come Back Peter (1969 film), a British sex comedy film
 Come Back Peter (1952 film), a British comedy film